Ludum Dare (LD; , meaning 'to give a game', also referenced as LDJAM) is a game jam competition. It was founded by Geoff Howland and was first held in April 2002. It is currently run by Mike Kasprzak, who has been part of the team since the beginning. Participants are required to create a video game that fits within a given theme in two or three days. Participants often release a time-lapse video of the development of their game.

History 

Ludum Dare was originally only an Internet forum. The first competition—often referred to as "Ludum Dare Zero"—was held in April 2002, with 18 participants. Its popularity turned the focus towards the competitions rather than the forum. The time limit was subsequently increased to 48 hours, because 24 hours were decided to be too few. Since 2011 the competition has seen significant annual increases in numbers of game submissions, partly owing to the public awareness of Minecraft designer Markus Persson, who has participated seven times.

Until 2014, the event was very informal as the Ludum Dare team worked on it in their spare time. Due to the increasing number of contestants, long-time organizer Mike Kasprzak announced in September 2014 that he would attempt at setting up a business model allowing him to work full-time on the project. Charging for Ludum Dare is however "out of question", and money is currently exclusively raised through donations.

During Ludum Dare 35 in April 2016, an announcement acknowledged various issues regarding the game jam's rating system. In particular, it explained that some users had attempted to artificially boost their game ratings with alternative accounts. As a consequence of this problem, future Ludum Dare events were indefinitely cancelled pending a replacement website being constructed for hosting the game jam. This led to a community backlash, and Ludum Dare 36 in August 2016 went ahead regardless, organized by website administrator and long-time community member Sorceress. Due to the complaints previously raised, the community decided by referendum to forego the game rating phase after the game jam, so no winners were named.

Starting in Ludum Dare 44, the schedule was changed to run twice per year in April and October due to organizer Mike Kasprzak struggling to keep up.

Competition structure 

Currently, Ludum Dare is held twice annually. In the week preceding each competition suggested themes are subject to votes by prospective participants. A theme is subsequently announced before participants are given 48 hours to create a video game (although board games or similar are accepted) that fits within it. All game code and content must be created during the competition and by a single person, and source code is encouraged to be included. During the event many participants record multiple screenshots of the development of their game to later produce a time-lapse video. In addition, many broadcast a live video stream, particularly since April 2013, when a widget showing Ludum Dare video streams hosted on Twitch was added to the Ludum Dare website. After the end of the competition participants are given three weeks to play and rate other submitted games to determine the winners. There are no physical or cash prizes, but each participant retains full ownership of their game—some have achieved financial success after developing their initial submission.

As of the 18th edition of the competition, which was held in August 2010, a more relaxed version called the "Jam" was introduced. The Jam, which allows development teams, private source code and extended development time of 72 hours, takes place concurrently with the solo competition ("Compo").

From early in the game jam's history until 2016, a smaller competition called "Mini Ludum Dare" or "MiniLD" was held during months without a main Ludum Dare competition. These were organised and run by community members with assistance from the website's various administrators and moderators. The host would choose the theme of the MiniLD, set the rules and duration, as well as prepare announcement posts throughout the event. Meanwhile, a staff member would create and manage the game submissions page, make various bookkeeping changes to the website, and generally oversee the event from behind the scenes. These MiniLDs were much more informal, and following the rules was usually optional. The themes were often more specific or technical, such as a jam focused on making games with reusable assets "Swap Shop", or making game-development tools "Tool Jam", or making a real-time-strategy games "7dRTS". Due to the popularity of hosting these smaller community-led events, a booking system was introduced, where interested persons would choose which MiniLD they wanted to host, which ended up with a two year backlog at its peak. After 70 MiniLDs, the event was retired after October 2016, much to the dismay of the community.

For several years during the 2010s, October was home to the October Challenge, which challenged people to "Finish a game, take it to market, and earn $1". Participants had 31 days to upload a link to their game to the website. The event was not competitive and was meant to encourage commercial game development from people who hadn't attempted to made money from their games previously.

Results 

Notes:
† — Competitions were held for only 24 hours.
‡ — Competition was run without ratings.

Notable games 
The following games were originally submitted to Ludum Dare:
 Broforce
 DMCA's Sky
 Evoland
 Friday Night Funkin'
 Galcon
 Gods Will Be Watching
 Inscryption
 Inside My Radio
 McPixel
 Mini Metro
 Minicraft
 Pony Island
 Pretentious Game
 The Republia Times
 Sneaky Sasquatch
 Snowden Run 3D
 Titan Souls
 Vox

References

External links 

 
Old Official Website
 
 List of editions of Mini Ludum Dare

Indie video games
Video game development competitions
Recurring events established in 2002
Game jams